The Storm is a 2009 American science fiction disaster miniseries directed by Bradford May. Based on a previous teleplay by Matthew Chernov and David Rosiak, it was written by David Abramowitz and Dennis A. Pratt and revolves around a weather creation system developed by the Atmospheric Research Institute that threatens life on Earth when deployed by the military. However, while scientist Dr. Jonathan Kirk (James Van Der Beek), Danni Wilson (Teri Polo), and detectives Devon Williams (Marisol Nichols) and Stilman (Luke Perry) attempt to save the world, the former is hunted by hitmen.

The first part of the film was broadcast on the NBC network July 26, 2009. The second part was broadcast on August 2, 2009.

Plot
Through his Atmospheric Research Institute, Robert Terrell (Treat Williams) has finally fulfilled his lifelong dream of completing "weather creation" technology, which has been a landmark event. However, during a test run, a team composed of Dr. Jonathan Kirk, Carly Meyers and Dr. Jack Hoffman send a blast of energy into the ionosphere, driving the planet into unexpected natural disasters. The experiment also causes a damage of the weather control laboratory which causes the police led by the detective Devon Williams to begin the investigation.

Dr. Jonathan Kirk (James Van Der Beek) is the only one to intervene and demand that the system be destroyed, but Terrell denies his requests, pushing his team forward. As a result, Dr. Kirk contacts news reporter Danni Wilson (Teri Polo) to help him expose the secrecy and lies — which turns out to be Terrell working with Army General Braxton (David James Elliott) to use the technology as a key military weapon instead of for philanthropic reasons, as initially claimed — of Terrell and the events that are unfolding. General Braxton, however, has ordered hit men to murder Dr. Kirk as he works his way to shut down the technology and save humanity. The hit men murder Danni first and make it look like she was killed by Dr. Kirk so he is immediately considered a prime suspect and arrested. However, Det. Williams begins to doubt that he is the murderer.

To show the importance of the discovery to General Braxton, Terrell orders the team to create a huge storm in Afghanistan which disables the Afghan rebels. But another blast of energy to the ionosphere only makes the situation worse and a strong hurricane appears over the Pacific, heading to Peru. The team then manages to redirect the hurricane away from the coast but then several hurricanes start to endanger the U.S. mainland, the largest being headed to Los Angeles.

After escaping the hit men again Dr. Kirk is captured by Stillman from the military intelligence who knows many things about the weather experiment. He shows Dr. Kirk the hole in the ionosphere which is the cause of the extreme weather around the world and offers him a help to develop a method to reverse the damage of the ionosphere. After Dr. Kirk succeeds Stillman admits he was a bait set by Terrell to  get Dr. Kirk back and tries to shoot him but he defeats Stillman and calls Det. Williams to join him during the visit of the lab. The hit men appear again and begin shooting at them but are killed by Det. Williams in the shootout.

As the Pentagon cancels the funding of the research for causing uncontrollable weather changes General Braxton pushes Terrell to stop the violent weather by all means necessary but the research team has no idea how to settle the things without making it worse. Facing the imminent catastrophe, Terrell stops pushing the team, allowing them to do whatever they want. Dr. Kirk arrives in time to apply his method to fix the hole in the ionosphere. The action is successful but Terrell who sees the solution for the problem changes his mind and aims a gun at the team. He is then shot by Det. Williams and General Braxton is arrested for causing a global danger but commits a suicide.

Cast
 James Van Der Beek as Dr. Jonathan Kirk
 Marisol Nichols as Detective Devon Williams
 Luke Perry as Stilman
 John Larroquette as Bud McGrath
 Treat Williams as Robert Terrell
 David James Elliott as General Wilson Braxton
 Troy Winbush as Brian Drexler
 Teri Polo as Danielle "Danni" Wilson
 Cameron Daddo as Andrew
 Jeannette Sousa as Gretchen 'Gretel' Mays
 Erin Chambers as Carly Meyers
 Rich Sommer as Dr. Jack Hoffman
 Patrick Labyorteaux as Carter
 Richmond Arquette as Till
 Jack Conley as Lt. Crandall
 Adam Mayfield as Brooks
 Jamison Yang as Rex Walker
 Ren Hanami as Dawn Maleuga

Home media
The Storm was released on DVD & Blu-ray on November 3, 2009.

External links
 
 
 The Storm TV Fan Forums
 The Storm Watch the Storm
 The Storm TVIV

2000s American television miniseries
American disaster films
Films directed by Bradford May